Joseph Brevard (July 19, 1766October 11, 1821) was an American Revolutionary War patriot. He was born in Rowan County (in the portion which later became Iredell County) in the Province of North Carolina.  He served on the South Carolina Supreme Court (1801-1815) and as U.S. Representative from District 9 of South Carolina (1819-1821).

Revolutionary war service
Joseph Brevard served first as an ensign and then lieutenant in the 1st North Carolina Regiment from 1781 to 1782.  He was transferred to the 3rd North Carolina Regiment on February 6, 1781, where he became a regimental quartermaster.  He served until the end of the war.

Post war
He moved to Camden, South Carolina, and became sheriff of Camden District (1789–1791). He served as commissioner in equity October 14, 1791. He studied law, was admitted to the bar in 1792, and commenced practice in Camden. He engaged in the compilation of the law reports which bear his name 1793-1815. He served as member of South Carolina House of Representatives from 1796 to 1799.

Brevard was elected judge of the State supreme court December 17, 1801, and served until December 1815, when he resigned. He resumed the practice of law in Camden.

Brevard was elected as a Republican to the Sixteenth Congress (1819–1821). He was not a candidate for renomination in 1820. He was an unsuccessful candidate for Congress at a special election held in 1821. He died in Camden on October 11, 1821, and was interred in the Quaker Cemetery, Camden, South Carolina.

References

 , portrait of Joseph Brevard

1766 births
1821 deaths
Members of the South Carolina House of Representatives
Continental Army officers from North Carolina
People from Iredell County, North Carolina
Democratic-Republican Party members of the United States House of Representatives from South Carolina
People from Camden, South Carolina
People from Rowan County, North Carolina